Surabaya Zoo (sometimes abbreviated as KBS and ), is a  zoo located in the city of Surabaya in East Java, Indonesia.

History

Surabaya Zoo was established by decree of the Governor General of the Netherlands East Indies on 31 August 1916 as Soerabaiasche Planten-en Dierentuin on the merit of the journalist H. F. K. Kommer who had the hobby of collecting animals.

In 1916, the first Surabaya Zoo was established in Kaliondo. On 28 September 1917, the zoo was moved to Groedo road. In April 1918, Surabaya Zoo sold tickets to enter the zoo.

In 1920, the zoo was transferred to another new location in Darmo area, on a plot of land measuring 30,500 m2 belonged to the Oost-Java Stoomtram Maatschappij (steam tramway company of East Java). On 21 July 1922, the zoo experienced its first financial crisis and there was a plan to disestablish the zoo, but the decision was not agreed by the Surabaya municipality at that time. On 11 May 1923, it was decided to establish a new association for the zoo. W. A. Hompes was chosen to replace J.P. Mooyman, one of the early founder of the zoo. In 1927, the zoo was financially aided by the mayor of Surabaya, Dijkerman. With the help of People's Representative Council of Surabaya, on 3 July 1927 a new plot of land was bought for Surabaya Zoo, measuring 32,000 m2, from a plot of land owned by steam tramway company of East Java.

From 1939 until now, the size of the zoo has expanded to 15 hectares.

In August–November 1987 the breeding facility in Surabaya Zoo was renovated. This facility comprised 29 aviaries with 16 endangered Bali starlings, found only in the western part of Bali island. In November 1987, the captive population was increased with the addition of 37 birds donated by zoos and private collections in the USA and by Jersey Wildlife Preservation Trust. The success of the breeding program of the Bali starling at this zoo allowed the release of 40 starlings into the wild at West Bali National Park in June 2011.

Animals

Current Animals
Sumatran elephant
Giraffe
White rhinoceros
Hippopotamus
Dromedary
Common ostrich
Plains zebra
Proboscis monkey
Sun bear
Saltwater crocodile
Komodo dragon
Muntjac
Lowland anoa
Blacktip shark
Common goldfish
Pygmy hippopotamus
Asian arowana
Rhinoceros hornbill
Babirusa
Bengal tiger
Javan leopard
Lion
Green iguana
Clownfish
Bawean deer
Horse
Mandrill
Malayan tapir
Agile wallaby
Royal blue tang
Sumatran tiger
Southern cassowary
Japanese macaque
Red-eared slider
Bornean orangutan
Xingu River ray
Red-bellied piranha
Siamang
Nubian ibex
Common warthog
Bali myna
Blue wildebeest
Giant gourami
Alligator gar
American black bear
American bison
Green peafowl
Lionfish
Pacu
Banteng
Indian peafowl
Tufted capuchin
Sunda porcupine
Chital
Long tailed macaque
Brahminy kite

Former Animals
American Bison
Grizzly Bear
American Black Bear
Cheetah
Sitatunga
Llama
Javan hawk eagle

Controversy

The Surabaya Zoo has received complaints about its treatment of animals from activist groups such as the Jakarta Animal Aid Network (JAAN), as well as from the interim administrator of the zoo.
The situation reached a point in 2010 where The Jakarta Post called the facility the 'Surabaya Zoo of Death'. 
In August, 2010, the Forestry Ministry revoked Surabaya Zoo’s license following several animal deaths, including a rare Sumatran tiger, African lion, wallaby, Komodo dragon, babirusa, Bawean deer, and crocodile.
Interim management asked the local police and the East Java Natural Resources Conservation Agency (BKSDA) to conduct an investigation, which found that negligent keepers were to blame for most of the animal deaths.
The Temporary Management Team transferred 378 animals from the zoo to 6 conservation organizations. However, several of the animals were in bad condition, and eventually died. An autopsy performed on the animals found plastic and wood inside the animals. The death of Melani the tiger, one of only a few hundred Sumatran tigers left in the world, outraged animal activists when it was discovered that the tiger was suffering from extreme digestive disorders before being rescued from the zoo.

On 2 March 2012, a giraffe died from ingesting plastic thrown by some visitors. 

On 28 January 2014 Surabaya Zoo authority announced that the zoo has a collection of 3,459 animals from 197 species, but 81 animals are sick, disabled, and old, and 44 of which are in severe conditions.

An online petition that calls for the closure of Surabaya Zoo due to continued mistreatment of animals reached 885,000 signatures before closing in late 2016.

Since 2017, the government has made some improvements to the zoo and made renovations to the enclosures to have better animal welfare and to make a better experience for guest.

Komodo dragon exhibit
As of March 2018, Surabaya Zoo had 76 Komodo dragons of which 13 were less than a year old, with more expected after the laying of a dozen eggs a few months earlier. To deal with the likely overpopulation, the Surabaya authority has planned to build a dragon park in Kenjeran coastal area, this being less expensive than attempting to release the dragons into the wild .

References

External links

 About Kebun Binatang Surabaya
 Tentang Kebun Binatang Surabaya
 Prahara Kebun Binatang Surabaya
 Facebook Page : Shutdown Surabaya Zoo[The Zoo of Death]
 The Telegraph[UK] gallery : Surabaya Zoo: animals kept in scandalous conditions at Indonesia's largest zoo

Buildings and structures in Surabaya
Companies based in Surabaya
Zoos in Indonesia
Zoos established in 1918
Tourist attractions in East Java